Clement Dorsey (1778 – August 6, 1848) was an American politician from Maryland.

He was born near Oaklands in Anne Arundel County, Maryland, in 1778; attended St. John's College, Annapolis, Maryland; studied law; was admitted to the bar and commenced practice. He was a major in the Maryland Militia 1812–1818. He was elected from Maryland's 1st Congressional district to the Nineteenth, Twentieth, and Twenty-first Congresses (March 4, 1825 – March 3, 1831); resumed the practice of law; unsuccessful candidate for election in 1832 to the Twenty-third Congress; judge of the fifth circuit court of Maryland until his death in Leonardtown, St. Mary's County, Maryland, August 6, 1848; interment in a private burial ground at "Summerseat," near Laurel Grove, Maryland.

References

1778 births
1848 deaths
St. John's College (Annapolis/Santa Fe) alumni
People from Anne Arundel County, Maryland
American militiamen in the War of 1812
Maryland Democratic-Republicans
National Republican Party members of the United States House of Representatives from Maryland
American militia officers
Dorsey family of Maryland
People from St. Mary's County, Maryland